Konstantinovo is a rural locality (a village) in Kuzminsky Rural Settlement, Rybnovsky District, Ryazan Oblast, Russia. Population: 

Konstantinovo is known for being the birthplace of poet Sergei Yesenin.

Demographics 
Konstantinovo had a population of 369 in 2002 and 359 in 2010.

References 

Rural localities in Ryazan Oblast